SS Roger B. Taney was a Liberty ship built in the United States during World War II. She was named after Roger B. Taney, who was the fifth Chief Justice of the Supreme Court, holding that office from 1836 until his death in 1864. Prior to joining the Supreme Court, Taney served as the United States Attorney General and United States Secretary of the Treasury under President Andrew Jackson.

Construction
Roger B. Taney was laid down on 21 June 1941, under a Maritime Commission (MARCOM) contract, MCE hull 17, by the Bethlehem-Fairfield Shipyard, Baltimore, Maryland; and was launched on 6 December 1941.

History
She was allocated to Waterman Steamship Corp., on 29 January 1942.

A torpedo wake had been spotted at midnight  ahead of the bow of the unescorted Roger B. Taney. The ship made a 90° turn but U-160 was able to maneuver into position to fire another torpedo that struck Roger B. Taney in the starboard side at the engine room. Her Armed guards, while remaining onboard while the crew abandoned ship, fired five rounds in the direction the torpedo had come from. Around 02:30 another torpedo struck the #4 hold causing a tremendous explosion. The Armed guard abandoned ship after this last attack.

U-160 then surfaced, and after questioning the survivors, left the area.

In total, eight officers, twenty-nine crewmen, one passenger, and nineteen Armed guards had managed to abandon the ship in two lifeboats before it sunk. 

One officer and two crewmen had been killed in the initial attack. While the two boats tried to stay together, after 36 hours they became separated. The British  was able to rescue one of the boats on 1 March 1943, and dropped the crew off at Bahia, 6 March 1943.

References

Bibliography

 
 
 
 
 

 

Liberty ships
Ships built in Baltimore
1941 ships
Ships sunk by German submarines in World War II
World War II shipwrecks in the Atlantic Ocean